Paul Mesnier (3 August 1904 in Saint-Étienne – 7 July 1988) was a French film director.

He was married to the actress Andrée Servilanges.

Filmography 
Director

 1937 : Le Chemin de lumière
 1938 : La Belle revanche
 1941 : Le Valet maître
 1942 : Patricia
 1943 : Madly in Love
 1947 : La Kermesse rouge
 1952 : Poil de carotte
 1956 : Babes a GoGo
 1957 : Une nuit aux Baléares
 1960 : Le Septième Jour de Saint-Malo
 1962 : Cargo pour la Réunion

Actor
 1950 : Olivia by Jacqueline Audry
 1950 : Casabianca by Georges Peclet
 1951 : They Were Five by Jack Pinoteau
 1953 : It Happened in Paris by Henri Lavorel and John Berry
 1953 : The Red Head 
 1966 : Triple Cross by Terence Young

External links 
 

French film directors
People from Saint-Étienne
1904 births
1988 deaths